On 24 May 2022, Then Indian National Congress President Sonia Gandhi constituted the Political Affairs Group, Task Force-2024 and Central Planning Group which will be presided over by her, for the upcoming 2024 Indian general election.

References

External links 

Next Indian general election
Indian National Congress campaigns
Indian general election campaigns